The 2018 Pacific Rugby League Tests are a group of rugby league test matches that were played on 23 June 2018 at Campbelltown Stadium in Sydney, Australia and the end of October at Mount Smart Stadium, Auckland.

Fixtures - June 2018

Melanesian Cup

Polynesian Cup

England vs New Zealand

Fixtures - October 2018

ANZAC test

Tonga vs Australia

Other matches

References

Further reading
 England v New Zealand: Denver Test backed by NRL-based England players. BBC Sport. 23 March 2018
 International rugby league in 2018

Pacific Rugby League International
Rugby league in Sydney
2018 in Fijian sport
2018 in Tongan sport
2018 in Papua New Guinea rugby league
2018 in Samoan sport
2018 in New Zealand rugby league
Rugby
Rugby
2018 in Australian rugby league